Khawaja Zakauddin (born 27 October 1936 in Jalandhar, Punjab, India) is a former field hockey forward from Pakistan who played from 1958 to 1966 . He played 56 International matches for Pakistan and scored 26 goals in his career . In 2009, he was given Pride of Performance award which is the highest civil award of Pakistan. After his retirement, he served as coach, chief selector and manager for Pakistan hockey at different times.

He is father-in-law of Pakistani hockey olympian . He had 4 sons Kamran Zaka,Adnan Zaka, Imran Zaka, Salmam Zaka.

And touqir dar is son in law.

See also
 Pakistan Hockey Federation

References

External links
 

1936 births
Living people
Pakistani male field hockey players
Olympic field hockey players of Pakistan
Olympic gold medalists for Pakistan
Olympic silver medalists for Pakistan
Olympic medalists in field hockey
Medalists at the 1960 Summer Olympics
Medalists at the 1964 Summer Olympics
Field hockey players at the 1960 Summer Olympics
Field hockey players at the 1964 Summer Olympics
Asian Games medalists in field hockey
Field hockey players at the 1958 Asian Games
Field hockey players at the 1962 Asian Games
Field hockey players at the 1966 Asian Games
Recipients of the Pride of Performance

Asian Games gold medalists for Pakistan
Asian Games silver medalists for Pakistan
Medalists at the 1958 Asian Games
Medalists at the 1962 Asian Games
Medalists at the 1966 Asian Games
20th-century Pakistani people